Alexander "Alex" Bell is a fictional character from the long-running Channel 4 soap opera Hollyoaks, played by Martino Lazzeri. He first appeared in September 1999 before leaving 3 years later in 2002.

Storylines
Alex arrived in Hollyoaks as a student and a computer nerd freak, who moved into Tony Hutchinson’s student house. Alex began dating a girl on the internet, and decided to visit her in Ireland. However he was shocked to discover that she had died and her parents had been sending the emails. Soon, Alex went on a trip with the lads on Rory Finnigan’s stag night in Barcelona, where he was chased by angry transvestite who stole his money belt. When Alex returned to Hollyoaks, he began to realise that he had feelings for Anna Green, but he was sidetracked when he discovered that he is infertile. Alex confided to Anna about his infertility and Anna told Geri Hudson, whilst Geri spread the gossip. Alex began to find it difficult coming to terms with his infertility and took it out on Anna for telling Geri. Meanwhile, Alex heard Chloe on the radio, making jokes about infertility and assumed she was having a dig at him. He exacted revenge by having a one-night stand with her and dumping her the next morning.

Alex's dad arrived to patch things up with his son after years of no contact and Anna was shocked that Alex’s father was gay. Alex refused to speak to his father, but finally began to realise how unkind he had been to Anna. Alex apologised to Anna for his behaviour and the pair finally got together. However, Alex’s life went from bad to worse when Anna revealed she was pregnant, but Alex was adamant that he couldn't be the father of Anna’s baby because of his infertility. Alex accused Anna of having an affair with Adam Morgan, but later discovered that the hospital had made a mistake and he was not infertile after all. Alex apologised to Anna, but was adamant that he didn't want the baby and offered Anna money to pay for an abortion. Despite Alex's attempts for Anna to have an abortion, Anna decided that she would give birth and then gave the baby up for adoption. When Anna gave birth to her child, Alex saw his child and was finally convinced that he wanted to keep him. Alex applied for Parental Responsibility and named the child Charlie, however Anna refused to accept the child. Alex was granted Parental Responsibility of Charlie and Anna realised that she has no choice but to try to make things work.

Anna and Alex both decide to provide the best for Charlie and they got a flat together to take tentative steps towards life as a family. As Alex presumed that Anna was happy, he was shocked and devastated when Anna revealed that she slept with Max Cunningham. Alex was shattered even more when Anna made it clear that she no longer loved him and moved in with the Cunninghams. Alex tried his best to persuade her to stay and asked her to marry him, but Anna made it clear that it is over between them. Slowly with the support of Becca Hayton, Alex saw Charlie as much as he could and began to date Becca. Alex than planned to take Charlie and Becca to live in Hong Kong for a new job offer he received without telling Anna. Alex's plan went well, but it reached a climax, when Anna made a mad rush at the airport to stop Alex taking away her son. Anna managed to catch Alex, and persuaded him to hand over Charlie, whilst Alex told Becca that he never loved her. Alex left Hollyoaks for Hong Kong, without Anna, Becca or Charlie, hoping that one day he could be reunited with his son.

Reception
Lorna Cooper of MSN TV listed Alex of one of Soap Opera's "forgotten characters".

References

Hollyoaks characters
Television characters introduced in 1999
Male characters in television